The UK Defence Journal is an online publication covering defence industry news in the United Kingdom, including military operations, equipment, and humanitarian work. The site also publishes fact-checks on military topics.

The site’s volunteer writers include military veterans, scholars, and industry experts. In addition to news content, the site also offers commentary and analysis of military topics ranging from national security policy to procurement decisions. The website has been mentioned by the UK Ministry of Defence, international governments, UK and international politicians and media personalities and TV shows such as Daily Politics as well as academic papers.

In 2016 the website published photos of all the Royal Navy's Type 45 Destroyer fleet in port at the same time. The article, picked up by Sky News, prompted questions about Britain’s naval preparedness.

In 2018 the website broke the news about the sale of HMS Ocean, a British helicopter carrier.
In May 2021, the website caused a stir on Twitter when it shared an image of French aircraft carrier Charles de Gaulle sailing with HMS Queen Elizabeth and HMS Prince of Wales, showing the former as being several times smaller than the latter two, with many taking it seriously.

In July 2021, the website broke the news that a user leaked classified documents relating to the Challenger 2 Main Battle Tank in service with the British Army in order to improve the performance of the vehicle in the videogame War Thunder.

In August 2022, the website was the first to break the news about the breakdown of HMS Prince of Wales, a British aircraft carrier, on the first day of the ship's deployment to the United States.

Publications

The website previously published a monthly magazine of the same name containing news and analysis about the British Armed Forces.

References

External links 

News blogs
Aviation websites
Military-themed websites
Military magazines published in the United Kingdom
Aviation magazines
Monthly magazines published in the United Kingdom
Transport magazines published in the United Kingdom
Magazines established in 2014